These page shows the results for the 66th edition of the Gent–Wevelgem cycling classic over 208 kilometres, held on Wednesday April 7, 2004. There were a total of 186 competitors, with 56 finishing the race, which was won by Belgium's Tom Boonen.

Final classification

References

External links
Official race website

Gent–Wevelgem
2004 in road cycling
2004 in Belgian sport
April 2004 sports events in Europe